Cabeceras is a district of the Tilarán canton, in the Guanacaste province of Costa Rica.

History 
Cabeceras was created on 11 June 2020 by Ley 20965. Originally part of Quebrada Grande district in the same Tilarán canton, of which it was allocated . 

The district has all the basic services such as schools, a high school, EBAIS (health services), ASADA (community managed potable water services), cemetery, soccer pitch, local business, coffee producers cooperative and a milk producers association.

Geography 
Cabeceras has an area of  km² and an elevation of  metres.

Demographics 

For the 2011 census, Cabeceras had not been created, its inhabitant were part of Quebrada Grande.

Transportation

Road transportation 
The district is covered by the following road routes:
 Route 145
 Route 606
 Route 619.

References 

Districts of Guanacaste Province
Populated places in Guanacaste Province